Amphilius atesuensis is a species of catfish in the genus Amphilius. Its length reaches 9.3 cm. It lives from the Saint John River in Liberia to the Mono River in Togo.

References 

atesuensis
Freshwater fish of West Africa
Fish described in 1904
Taxa named by George Albert Boulenger